The men's shot put field event at the 1972 Olympic Games took place on September 8 & 9. Twenty-nine athletes from 19 nations competed. The maximum number of athletes per nation had been set at 3 since the 1930 Olympic Congress.

The East German throwers were expected to pose a big challenge in these games, as well as the throwers from Poland.  Brian Oldfield from the United States was the first person to use a new technique, a technique that is similar to the discus throwing style. The thrower uses a rotational spin before releasing the shot put.

The event was won by Władysław Komar of Poland, the nation's first medal in the men's shot put. It was the first time since World War II that an American had not won; George Woods had the best result for the United States with silver. It was Woods' second consecutive silver, making him the eighth man to win two medals in the event. Hartmut Briesenick took bronze, East Germany's first medal in the shot put and the first medal for any German since Hans Woellke's 1936 win (the last time a non-American had won).

Background

This was the 17th appearance of the event, which is one of 12 athletics events to have been held at every Summer Olympics. Returning finalists from the 1968 Games were silver medalist George Woods of the United States, sixth-place finisher (and 1964 finalist) Władysław Komar of Poland, eighth-place finisher Heinfried Birlenbach and twelfth-place finisher Traugott Glöckler of West Germany, and eleventh-place finisher (and 1964 finalist) Les Mills of New Zealand. The American team was favored, but not as dominant as prior years. East Germany had a strong team, with three-time Olympian Komar also a contender.

India, Nigeria, and Saudi Arabia each made their debut in the men's shot put. The United States appeared for the 17th time, the only nation to have competed in all Olympic shot put competitions to date.

Competition format

The competition used the two-round format introduced in 1936, with the qualifying round completely separate from the divided final. In qualifying, each athlete received three attempts; those recording a mark of at least 19.00 metres advanced to the final. If fewer than 12 athletes achieved that distance, the top 12 would advance. The results of the qualifying round were then ignored. Finalists received three throws each, with the top eight competitors receiving an additional three attempts. The best distance among those six throws counted.

Records

These were the standing world and Olympic records (in metres) prior to the 1972 Summer Olympics.

The Olympic record fell quickly, with Hartmut Briesenick's first throw in the final reaching 20.97 metres. Briesenick had been the sixth thrower in the order; the seventh (Brian Oldfield) and tenth (Al Feuerbach) came in between the old record and Briesenick's new one. The thirteenth, Hans-Peter Gies, threw 21.14 metres for a new record. The fourteenth thrower, however, was Władysław Komar—who threw 21.18 metres to set a new record that would last through the competition. George Woods became the sixth man to beat the old record in the third round, and came within a centimetre of Komar's new record in the fourth. In all, 20 throws from six men were better than the old record.

Schedule

All times are Central European Time (UTC+1)

Results

All throwers reaching  and the top 12 including ties advanced to the finals. Shown in blue. All distances are listed in metres.

Qualifying

Final

References

External links
Official report

Men's shot put
Shot put at the Olympics
Men's events at the 1972 Summer Olympics